Goodfellas (stylized as GoodFellas) is a 1990 crime drama film directed by Martin Scorsese.

Goodfellas may also refer to:
Arts, entertainment, and media
Goodfellas (504 Boyz album), 2000
Goodfellas (Show and A.G. album), 1995
Goodfellas (soundtrack), the soundtrack to Scorsese's 1990 film
Brands and enterprises
 Goodfella's, Irish frozen pizza brand